Geoffrey Chaucer (– 25 October 1400) was an English poet, author, and civil servant best known for The Canterbury Tales. He has been called the "father of English literature", or, alternatively, the "father of English poetry".  He was the first writer to be buried in what has since come to be called Poets' Corner, in Westminster Abbey. Chaucer also gained fame as a philosopher and astronomer, composing the scientific A Treatise on the Astrolabe for his 10-year-old son Lewis. He maintained a career in the civil service as a bureaucrat, courtier, diplomat, and member of parliament.

Among Chaucer's many other works are The Book of the Duchess, The House of Fame, The Legend of Good Women, and Troilus and Criseyde. He is seen as crucial in legitimising the literary use of Middle English when the dominant literary languages in England were still Anglo-Norman French and Latin. Chaucer's contemporary Thomas Hoccleve hailed him as "the firste fyndere of our fair langage". Almost two thousand English words are first attested to in Chaucerian manuscripts.

Life

Origin

Chaucer was born in London most likely in the early 1340s (by some accounts, including his monument, he was born in 1343), though the precise date and location remain unknown. The Chaucer family offers an extraordinary example of upward mobility. His great-grandfather was a tavern keeper, his grandfather worked as a purveyor of wines, and his father John Chaucer rose to become an important wine merchant with a royal appointment. Several previous generations of Geoffrey Chaucer's family had been vintners and merchants in Ipswich. His family name is derived from the French chaucier, once thought to mean 'shoemaker', but now known to mean a maker of hose or leggings. 

In 1324, his father John Chaucer was kidnapped by an aunt in the hope of marrying the 12-year-old to her daughter in an attempt to keep the property in Ipswich. The aunt was imprisoned and fined £250, now equivalent to about £, which suggests that the family was financially secure.

John Chaucer married Agnes Copton, who inherited properties in 1349, including 24 shops in London from her uncle Hamo de Copton, who is described in a will dated 3 April 1354 and listed in the City Hustings Roll as "moneyer", said to be a moneyer at the Tower of London. In the City Hustings Roll 110, 5, Ric II, dated June 1380, Chaucer refers to himself as me Galfridum Chaucer, filium Johannis Chaucer, Vinetarii, Londonie, which translates as: "I, Geoffrey Chaucer, son of the vintner John Chaucer, London".

Career

While records concerning the lives of his contemporaries William Langland and the Gawain Poet are practically non-existent, since Chaucer was a public servant his official life is very well documented, with nearly five hundred written items testifying to his career. The first of the "Chaucer Life Records" appears in 1357, in the household accounts of Elizabeth de Burgh, the Countess of Ulster, when he became the noblewoman's page through his father's connections, a common medieval form of apprenticeship for boys into knighthood or prestige appointments. The countess was married to Lionel of Antwerp, 1st Duke of Clarence, the second surviving son of the king, Edward III, and the position brought the teenage Chaucer into the close court circle, where he was to remain for the rest of his life. He also worked as a courtier, a diplomat, and a civil servant, as well as working for the king from 1389 to 1391 as Clerk of the King's Works.

In 1359, the early stages of the Hundred Years' War, Edward III invaded France and Chaucer travelled with Lionel of Antwerp, Elizabeth's husband, as part of the English army. In 1360, he was captured during the siege of Rheims. Edward paid £16 for his ransom, a considerable sum , and Chaucer was released.

After this, Chaucer's life is uncertain, but he seems to have travelled in France, Spain, and Flanders, possibly as a messenger and perhaps even going on a pilgrimage to Santiago de Compostela. Around 1366, Chaucer married Philippa (de) Roet. She was a lady-in-waiting to Edward III's queen, Philippa of Hainault, and a sister of Katherine Swynford, who later (c. 1396) became the third wife of John of Gaunt. It is uncertain how many children Chaucer and Philippa had, but three or four are most commonly cited. His son, Thomas Chaucer, had an illustrious career, as chief butler to four kings, envoy to France, and Speaker of the House of Commons. Thomas's daughter, Alice, married the Duke of Suffolk. Thomas's great-grandson (Geoffrey's great-great-grandson), John de la Pole, Earl of Lincoln, was the heir to the throne designated by Richard III before he was deposed. Geoffrey's other children probably included Elizabeth Chaucy, a nun at Barking Abbey, Agnes, an attendant at Henry IV's coronation; and another son, Lewis Chaucer. Chaucer's "Treatise on the Astrolabe" was written for Lewis.

According to tradition, Chaucer studied law in the Inner Temple (an Inn of Court) at this time. He became a member of the royal court of Edward III as a valet de chambre, yeoman, or esquire on 20 June 1367, a position which could entail a wide variety of tasks. His wife also received a pension for court employment. He travelled abroad many times, at least some of them in his role as a valet. In 1368, he may have attended the wedding of Lionel of Antwerp to Violante Visconti, daughter of Galeazzo II Visconti, in Milan. Two other literary stars of the era were in attendance: Jean Froissart and Petrarch. Around this time, Chaucer is believed to have written The Book of the Duchess in honour of Blanche of Lancaster, the late wife of John of Gaunt, who died in 1369 of the plague.

Chaucer travelled to Picardy the next year as part of a military expedition; in 1373 he visited Genoa and Florence. Numerous scholars such as Skeat, Boitani, and Rowland suggested that, on this Italian trip, he came into contact with Petrarch or Boccaccio. They introduced him to medieval Italian poetry, the forms and stories of which he would use later. The purposes of a voyage in 1377 are mysterious, as details within the historical record conflict. Later documents suggest it was a mission, along with Jean Froissart, to arrange a marriage between the future King Richard II and a French princess, thereby ending the Hundred Years' War. If this was the purpose of their trip, they seem to have been unsuccessful, as no wedding occurred.

In 1378, Richard II sent Chaucer as an envoy (secret dispatch) to the Visconti and to Sir John Hawkwood, English condottiere (mercenary leader) in Milan. It has been speculated that it was Hawkwood on whom Chaucer based his character the Knight in the Canterbury Tales, for a description matches that of a 14th-century condottiere.

A possible indication that his career as a writer was appreciated came when Edward III granted Chaucer "a gallon of wine daily for the rest of his life" for some unspecified task. This was an unusual grant, but given on a day of celebration, St George's Day, 1374, when artistic endeavours were traditionally rewarded, it is assumed to have been for another early poetic work. It is not known which, if any, of Chaucer's extant works prompted the reward, but the suggestion of him as poet to a king places him as a precursor to later poets laureate. Chaucer continued to collect the liquid stipend until Richard II came to power, after which it was converted to a monetary grant on 18 April 1378.

Chaucer obtained the very substantial job of comptroller of the customs for the port of London, which he began on 8 June 1374. He must have been suited for the role as he continued in it for twelve years, a long time in such a post at that time. His life goes undocumented for much of the next ten years, but it is believed that he wrote (or began) most of his famous works during this period. 

On 16 October 1379 Thomas Staundon filed a legal action against his former servant Cecily Chaumpaigne and Chaucer, accusing Chaucer of unlawfully employing Chaumpaigne before her term of service was completed, which violated the Statute of Labourers. Though eight court documents dated between October 1379 and July 1380 survive from the action, the case was never prosecuted and no details survive about Chaumpaigne's service or how she came to leave Staundon's employ for Chaucer's.

It is not known if Chaucer was in the City of London at the time of the Peasants' Revolt, but if he was, he would have seen its leaders pass almost directly under his apartment window at Aldgate.

While still working as comptroller, Chaucer appears to have moved to Kent, being appointed as one of the commissioners of peace for Kent, at a time when French invasion was a possibility. He is thought to have started work on The Canterbury Tales in the early 1380s. He also became a member of parliament for Kent in 1386, and attended the 'Wonderful Parliament' that year. He appears to have been present at most of the 71 days it sat, for which he was paid £24 9s. On 15 October that year, he gave a deposition in the case of Scrope v. Grosvenor. There is no further reference after this date to Philippa, Chaucer's wife, and she is presumed to have died in 1387. He survived the political upheavals caused by the Lords Appellants, despite the fact that Chaucer knew some of the men executed over the affair quite well.

On 12 July 1389, Chaucer was appointed the clerk of the king's works, a sort of foreman organising most of the king's building projects. No major works were begun during his tenure, but he did conduct repairs on Westminster Palace, St. George's Chapel, Windsor, continued building the wharf at the Tower of London, and built the stands for a tournament held in 1390. It may have been a difficult job, but it paid well: two shillings a day, more than three times his salary as a comptroller. Chaucer was also appointed keeper of the lodge at the King's park in Feckenham Forest in Worcestershire, which was a largely honorary appointment.

Later life

In September 1390, records say that Chaucer was robbed and possibly injured while conducting the business, and he stopped working in this capacity on 17 June 1391. He began as Deputy Forester in the royal forest of Petherton Park in North Petherton, Somerset on 22 June. This was no sinecure, with maintenance an important part of the job, although there were many opportunities to derive profit.

Richard II granted him an annual pension of 20 pounds in 1394, and Chaucer's name fades from the historical record not long after Richard's overthrow in 1399. The last few records of his life show his pension renewed by the new king, and his taking a lease on a residence within the close of Westminster Abbey on 24 December 1399. Henry IV renewed the grants assigned by Richard, but The Complaint of Chaucer to his Purse hints that the grants might not have been paid. The last mention of Chaucer is on 5 June 1400 when some debts owed to him were repaid.

Chaucer died of unknown causes on 25 October 1400, although the only evidence for this date comes from the engraving on his tomb which was erected more than 100 years after his death. There is some speculation that he was murdered by enemies of Richard II or even on the orders of his successor Henry IV, but the case is entirely circumstantial. Chaucer was buried in Westminster Abbey in London, as was his right owing to his status as a tenant of the Abbey's close. In 1556, his remains were transferred to a more ornate tomb, making him the first writer interred in the area now known as Poets' Corner.

Relationship to John of Gaunt
Chaucer was a close friend of John of Gaunt, the wealthy Duke of Lancaster and father of Henry IV, and he served under Lancaster's patronage. Near the end of their lives, Lancaster and Chaucer became brothers-in-law when Lancaster married Katherine Swynford (de Roet) in 1396; she was the sister of Philippa (de) Roet, whom Chaucer had married in 1366.

Chaucer's The Book of the Duchess (also known as the Deeth of Blaunche the Duchesse) was written in commemoration of Blanche of Lancaster, John of Gaunt's first wife. The poem refers to John and Blanche in allegory as the narrator relates the tale of "A long castel with walles white/Be Seynt Johan, on a ryche hil" (1318–1319) who is mourning grievously after the death of his love, "And goode faire White she het/That was my lady name ryght" (948–949). The phrase "long castel" is a reference to Lancaster (also called "Loncastel" and "Longcastell"), "walles white" is thought to be an oblique reference to Blanche, "Seynt Johan" was John of Gaunt's name-saint, and "ryche hil" is a reference to Richmond. These references reveal the identity of the grieving black knight of the poem as John of Gaunt, Duke of Lancaster and Earl of Richmond. "White" is the English translation of the French word "blanche", implying that the white lady was Blanche of Lancaster.

Poem Fortune

Chaucer's short poem Fortune, believed to have been written in the 1390s, is also thought to refer to Lancaster. "Chaucer as narrator" openly defies Fortune, proclaiming that he has learned who his enemies are through her tyranny and deceit, and declares "my suffisaunce" (15) and that "over himself hath the maystrye" (14).

Fortune, in turn, does not understand Chaucer's harsh words to her for she believes that she has been kind to him, claims that he does not know what she has in store for him in the future, but most importantly, "And eek thou hast thy beste frend alyve" (32, 40, 48). Chaucer retorts, "My frend maystow nat reven, blind goddesse" (50) and orders her to take away those who merely pretend to be his friends.

Fortune turns her attention to three princes whom she implores to relieve Chaucer of his pain and "Preyeth his beste frend of his noblesse/That to som beter estat he may atteyne" (78–79). The three princes are believed to represent the dukes of Lancaster, York, and Gloucester, and a portion of line 76 ("as three of you or tweyne") is thought to refer to the ordinance of 1390 which specified that no royal gift could be authorised without the consent of at least two of the three dukes.

Most conspicuous in this short poem is the number of references to Chaucer's "beste frend". Fortune states three times in her response to the plaintiff, "And also, you still have your best friend alive" (32, 40, 48); she also refers to his "beste frend" in the envoy when appealing to his "noblesse" to help Chaucer to a higher estate. The narrator makes a fifth reference when he rails at Fortune that she shall not take his friend from him.

Religious beliefs
Chaucer's attitudes toward the Church should not be confused with his attitudes toward Christianity. He seems to have respected and admired Christians and to have been one himself, though he also recognised that many people in the church were venal and corrupt. He wrote in Canterbury Tales, "now I beg all those that listen to this little treatise, or read it, that if there be anything in it that pleases them, they thank our Lord Jesus Christ for it, from whom proceeds all understanding and goodness."

Literary works

Chaucer's first major work was The Book of the Duchess, an elegy for Blanche of Lancaster who died in 1368. Two other early works were Anelida and Arcite and The House of Fame. He wrote many of his major works in a prolific period when he held the job of customs comptroller for London (1374 to 1386). His Parlement of Foules, The Legend of Good Women, and Troilus and Criseyde all date from this time. It is believed that he started The Canterbury Tales in the 1380s.

Chaucer also translated Boethius' Consolation of Philosophy and The Romance of the Rose by Guillaume de Lorris (extended by Jean de Meun). Eustache Deschamps called himself a "nettle in Chaucer's garden of poetry". In 1385, Thomas Usk made glowing mention of Chaucer, and John Gower also lauded him.

Chaucer's Treatise on the Astrolabe describes the form and use of the astrolabe in detail and is sometimes cited as the first example of technical writing in the English language, and it indicates that Chaucer was versed in science in addition to his literary talents. The equatorie of the planetis is a scientific work similar to the Treatise and sometimes ascribed to Chaucer because of its language and handwriting, an identification which scholars no longer deem tenable.

Influence

Linguistic

Chaucer wrote in continental accentual-syllabic metre, a style which had developed in English literature since around the 12th century as an alternative to the alliterative Anglo-Saxon metre. Chaucer is known for metrical innovation, inventing the rhyme royal, and he was one of the first English poets to use the five-stress line, a decasyllabic cousin to the iambic pentametre, in his work, with only a few anonymous short works using it before him. The arrangement of these five-stress lines into rhyming couplets, first seen in his The Legend of Good Women, was used in much of his later work and became one of the standard poetic forms in English. His early influence as a satirist is also important, with the common humorous device, the funny accent of a regional dialect, apparently making its first appearance in The Reeve's Tale.

The poetry of Chaucer, along with other writers of the era, is credited with helping to standardise the London Dialect of the Middle English language from a combination of the Kentish and Midlands dialects. This is probably overstated; the influence of the court, chancery and bureaucracy – of which Chaucer was a part – remains a more probable influence on the development of Standard English.

Modern English is somewhat distanced from the language of Chaucer's poems owing to the effect of the Great Vowel Shift some time after his death. This change in the pronunciation of English, still not fully understood, makes the reading of Chaucer difficult for the modern audience.

The status of the final -e in Chaucer's verse is uncertain: it seems likely that during the period of Chaucer's writing the final -e was dropping out of colloquial English and that its use was somewhat irregular. It may have been a vestige of the Old English dative singular suffix -e attached to most nouns. Chaucer's versification suggests that the final -e is sometimes to be vocalised, and sometimes to be silent; however, this remains a point on which there is disagreement. When it is vocalised, most scholars pronounce it as a schwa.

Apart from the irregular spelling, much of the vocabulary is recognisable to the modern reader. Chaucer is also recorded in the Oxford English Dictionary as the first author to use many common English words in his writings. These words were probably frequently used in the language at the time but Chaucer, with his ear for common speech, is the earliest extant manuscript source. Acceptable, alkali, altercation, amble, angrily, annex, annoyance, approaching, arbitration, armless, army, arrogant, arsenic, arc, artillery and aspect are just some of almost two thousand English words first attested in Chaucer.

Literary

Widespread knowledge of Chaucer's works is attested by the many poets who imitated or responded to his writing. John Lydgate was one of the earliest poets to write continuations of Chaucer's unfinished Tales while Robert Henryson's Testament of Cresseid completes the story of Cressida left unfinished in his Troilus and Criseyde. Many of the manuscripts of Chaucer's works contain material from these poets and later appreciations by the Romantic era poets were shaped by their failure to distinguish the later "additions" from original Chaucer.

Writers of the 17th and 18th centuries, such as John Dryden, admired Chaucer for his stories, but not for his rhythm and rhyme, as few critics could then read Middle English and the text had been butchered by printers, leaving a somewhat unadmirable mess. It was not until the late 19th century that the official Chaucerian canon, accepted today, was decided upon, largely as a result of Walter William Skeat's work. Roughly seventy-five years after Chaucer's death, The Canterbury Tales was selected by William Caxton to be one of the first books to be printed in England.

English
Chaucer is sometimes considered the source of the English vernacular tradition. His achievement for the language can be seen as part of a general historical trend towards the creation of a vernacular literature, after the example of Dante, in many parts of Europe. A parallel trend in Chaucer's own lifetime was underway in Scotland through the work of his slightly earlier contemporary, John Barbour, and was likely to have been even more general, as is evidenced by the example of the Pearl Poet in the north of England.

Although Chaucer's language is much closer to Modern English than the text of Beowulf, such that (unlike that of Beowulf) a Modern English-speaker with a large vocabulary of archaic words may understand it, it differs enough that most publications modernise his idiom. The following is a sample from the prologue of The Summoner's Tale that compares Chaucer's text to a modern translation:

{| cellspacing="4" style="white-space: nowrap;"
| || Original Text || Modern Translation
|-
| || This frere bosteth that he knoweth helle,
| This friar boasts that he knows hell,
|-
| || And God it woot, that it is litel wonder;
| And God knows that it is little wonder;
|-
| || Freres and feendes been but lyte asonder.
| Friars and fiends are seldom far apart.
|-
| || For, pardee, ye han ofte tyme herd telle
| For, by God, you have ofttimes heard tell
|-
|  || How that a frere ravyshed was to helle
| How a friar was taken to hell
|-
| || In spirit ones by a visioun;
| In spirit, once by a vision;
|-
| || And as an angel ladde hym up and doun,
| And as an angel led him up and down,
|-
|  || To shewen hym the peynes that the were,
| To show him the pains that were there,
|-
| || In al the place saugh he nat a frere;
| In all the place he saw not a friar;
|-
| || Of oother folk he saugh ynowe in wo.
| Of other folk he saw enough in woe.
|-
|  || Unto this angel spak the frere tho:
| Unto this angel spoke the friar thus:
|-
| || Now, sire, quod he, han freres swich a grace     
| "Now sir", said he, "Have friars such a grace
|-
| || That noon of hem shal come to this place?
| That none of them come to this place?"
|-
| || Yis, quod this aungel, many a millioun!
| "Yes", said the angel, "many a million!"
|-
| || And unto sathanas he ladde hym doun.
| And unto Satan the angel led him down.
|-
| || –And now hath sathanas, –seith he, –a tayl
| "And now Satan has", he said, "a tail,
|-
|  || Brodder than of a carryk is the sayl.
| Broader than a galleon's sail.
|-
| || Hold up thy tayl, thou sathanas!–quod he;
| Hold up your tail, Satan!" said he.
|-
| || –shewe forth thyn ers, and lat the frere se
| "Show forth your arse, and let the friar see
|-
| || Where is the nest of freres in this place!–
| Where the nest of friars is in this place!"
|-
| || And er that half a furlong wey of space,
| And before half a furlong of space,
|-
| || Right so as bees out swarmen from an hyve,    
| Just as bees swarm out from a hive,
|-
| ||Out of the develes ers ther gonne dryve
| Out of the devil's arse there were driven
|-
| || Twenty thousand freres on a route,
| Twenty thousand friars on a rout,
|-
| || And thurghout helle swarmed al aboute,
| And throughout hell swarmed all about,
|-
| || And comen agayn as faste as they may gon,    
| And came again as fast as they could go,
|-
| || And in his ers they crepten everychon.
| And every one crept into his arse.
|-
|  ||He clapte his tayl agayn and lay ful stille.
| He shut his tail again and lay very still.
|}

Valentine's Day and romance
The first recorded association of Valentine's Day with romantic love is believed to be in Chaucer's Parlement of Foules (1382), a dream vision portraying a parliament for birds to choose their mates. Honouring the first anniversary of the engagement of fifteen-year-old King Richard II of England to fifteen-year-old Anne of Bohemia:

For this was on seynt Volantynys dayWhan euery bryd comyth there to chese his makeOf euery kynde that men thinke mayAnd that so heuge a noyse gan they makeThat erthe & eyr & tre & euery lakeSo ful was that onethe was there spaceFor me to stonde, so ful was al the place.

Critical reception

Early criticism

The poet Thomas Hoccleve, who may have met Chaucer and considered him his role model, hailed Chaucer as "the firste fyndere of our fair langage". John Lydgate referred to Chaucer within his own text The Fall of Princes as the "lodesterre (guiding principle) … off our language". Around two centuries later, Sir Philip Sidney greatly praised Troilus and Criseyde in his own Defence of Poesie. During the nineteenth and early twentieth century, Chaucer came to be viewed as a symbol of the nation's poetic heritage. 

In Charles Dickens' 1850 novel David Copperfield, the Victorian era author echoed Chaucer's use of Luke 23:34 from Troilus and Criseyde (Dickens held a copy in his library among other works of Chaucer), with G. K. Chesterton writing, "among the great canonical English authors, Chaucer and Dickens have the most in common."

Manuscripts and audience
The large number of surviving manuscripts of Chaucer's works is testimony to the enduring interest in his poetry prior to the arrival of the printing press. There are 83 surviving manuscripts of the Canterbury Tales (in whole or part) alone, along with sixteen of Troilus and Criseyde, including the personal copy of Henry IV. Given the ravages of time, it is likely that these surviving manuscripts represent hundreds since lost.

Chaucer's original audience was a courtly one, and would have included women as well as men of the upper social classes. Yet even before his death in 1400, Chaucer's audience had begun to include members of the rising literate, middle and merchant classes. This included many Lollard sympathisers who may well have been inclined to read Chaucer as one of their own.

Lollards were particularly attracted to Chaucer's satirical writings about friars, priests, and other church officials. In 1464, John Baron, a tenant farmer in Agmondesham (Amersham in Buckinghamshire), was brought before John Chadworth, the Bishop of Lincoln, on charges of being a Lollard heretic; he confessed to owning a "boke of the Tales of Caunterburie" among other suspect volumes.

Printed editions

The first English printer, William Caxton, was responsible for the first two folio editions of The Canterbury Tales which were published in 1478 and 1483. Caxton's second printing, by his own account, came about because a customer complained that the printed text differed from a manuscript he knew; Caxton obligingly used the man's manuscript as his source. Both Caxton editions carry the equivalent of manuscript authority. Caxton's edition was reprinted by his successor, Wynkyn de Worde, but this edition has no independent authority.
 
Richard Pynson, the King's Printer under Henry VIII for about twenty years, was the first to collect and sell something that resembled an edition of the collected works of Chaucer; however, in the process, he introduced five previously printed texts that are now known not to be Chaucer's. (The collection is actually three separately printed texts, or collections of texts, bound together as one volume.)

There is a likely connection between Pynson's product and William Thynne's a mere six years later. Thynne had a successful career from the 1520s until his death in 1546, as chief clerk of the kitchen of Henry VIII, one of the masters of the royal household. He spent years comparing various versions of Chaucer's works, and selected 41 pieces for publication. While there were questions over the authorship of some of the material, there is not doubt this was the first comprehensive view of Chaucer's work. The Workes of Geffray Chaucer, published in 1532, was the first edition of Chaucer's collected works. Thynne's editions of Chaucer's Works in 1532 and 1542 were the first major contributions to the existence of a widely recognised Chaucerian canon. Thynne represents his edition as a book sponsored by and supportive of the king who is praised in the preface by Sir Brian Tuke. Thynne's canon brought the number of apocryphal works associated with Chaucer to a total of 28, even if that was not his intention. As with Pynson, once included in the Works, pseudepigraphic texts stayed with those works, regardless of their first editor's intentions.

In the 16th and 17th centuries, Chaucer was printed more than any other English author, and he was the first author to have his works collected in comprehensive single-volume editions in which a Chaucer canon began to cohere. Some scholars contend that 16th-century editions of Chaucer's Works set the precedent for all other English authors in terms of presentation, prestige and success in print. These editions certainly established Chaucer's reputation, but they also began the complicated process of reconstructing and frequently inventing Chaucer's biography and the canonical list of works which were attributed to him.

Probably the most significant aspect of the growing apocrypha is that, beginning with Thynne's editions, it began to include medieval texts that made Chaucer appear as a proto-Protestant Lollard, primarily the Testament of Love and The Plowman's Tale. As "Chaucerian" works that were not considered apocryphal until the late 19th century, these medieval texts enjoyed a new life, with English Protestants carrying on the earlier Lollard project of appropriating existing texts and authors who seemed sympathetic—or malleable enough to be construed as sympathetic—to their cause. The official Chaucer of the early printed volumes of his Works was construed as a proto-Protestant as the same was done, concurrently, with William Langland and Piers Plowman.

The famous Plowman's Tale did not enter Thynne's Works until the second, 1542, edition. Its entry was surely facilitated by Thynne's inclusion of Thomas Usk's Testament of Love in the first edition. The Testament of Love imitates, borrows from, and thus resembles Usk's contemporary, Chaucer. (Testament of Love also appears to borrow from Piers Plowman.)

Since the Testament of Love mentions its author's part in a failed plot (book 1, chapter 6), his imprisonment, and (perhaps) a recantation of (possibly Lollard) heresy, all this was associated with Chaucer. (Usk himself was executed as a traitor in 1388.) John Foxe took this recantation of heresy as a defence of the true faith, calling Chaucer a "right Wiclevian" and (erroneously) identifying him as a schoolmate and close friend of John Wycliffe at Merton College, Oxford. (Thomas Speght is careful to highlight these facts in his editions and his "Life of Chaucer".) No other sources for the Testament of Love exist—there is only Thynne's construction of whatever manuscript sources he had.

John Stow (1525–1605) was an antiquarian and also a chronicler. His edition of Chaucer's Works in 1561 brought the apocrypha to more than 50 titles. More were added in the 17th century, and they remained as late as 1810, well after Thomas Tyrwhitt pared the canon down in his 1775 edition. The compilation and printing of Chaucer's works was, from its beginning, a political enterprise, since it was intended to establish an English national identity and history that grounded and authorised the Tudor monarchy and church. What was added to Chaucer often helped represent him favourably to Protestant England.

In his 1598 edition of the Works, Speght (probably taking cues from Foxe) made good use of Usk's account of his political intrigue and imprisonment in the Testament of Love to assemble a largely fictional "Life of Our Learned English Poet, Geffrey Chaucer". Speght's "Life" presents readers with an erstwhile radical in troubled times much like their own, a proto-Protestant who eventually came round to the king's views on religion. Speght states, "In the second year of Richard the second, the King tooke Geffrey Chaucer and his lands into his protection. The occasion wherof no doubt was some daunger and trouble whereinto he was fallen by favouring some rash attempt of the common people." Under the discussion of Chaucer's friends, namely John of Gaunt, Speght further explains:

Yet it seemeth that [Chaucer] was in some trouble in the daies of King Richard the second, as it may appeare in the Testament of Loue: where hee doth greatly complaine of his owne rashnesse in following the multitude, and of their hatred against him for bewraying their purpose. And in that complaint which he maketh to his empty purse, I do find a written copy, which I had of Iohn Stow (whose library hath helped many writers) wherein ten times more is adioined, then is in print. Where he maketh great lamentation for his wrongfull imprisonment, wishing death to end his daies: which in my iudgement doth greatly accord with that in the Testament of Loue. Moreouer we find it thus in Record.

Later, in "The Argument" to the Testament of Love, Speght adds:
Chaucer did compile this booke as a comfort to himselfe after great griefs conceiued for some rash attempts of the commons, with whome he had ioyned, and thereby was in feare to loose the fauour of his best friends.

Speght is also the source of the famous tale of Chaucer being fined for beating a Franciscan friar in Fleet Street, as well as a fictitious coat of arms and family tree. Ironically – and perhaps consciously so – an introductory, apologetic letter in Speght's edition from Francis Beaumont defends the unseemly, "low", and bawdy bits in Chaucer from an elite, classicist position.

Francis Thynne noted some of these inconsistencies in his Animadversions, insisting that Chaucer was not a commoner, and he objected to the friar-beating story. Yet Thynne himself underscores Chaucer's support for popular religious reform, associating Chaucer's views with his father William Thynne's attempts to include The Plowman's Tale and The Pilgrim's Tale in the 1532 and 1542 Works.

The myth of the Protestant Chaucer continues to have a lasting impact on a large body of Chaucerian scholarship. Though it is extremely rare for a modern scholar to suggest Chaucer supported a religious movement that did not exist until more than a century after his death, the predominance of this thinking for so many centuries left it for granted that Chaucer was at least hostile toward Catholicism. This assumption forms a large part of many critical approaches to Chaucer's works, including neo-Marxism.

Alongside Chaucer's Works, the most impressive literary monument of the period is John Foxe's Acts and Monuments.... As with the Chaucer editions, it was critically significant to English Protestant identity and included Chaucer in its project. Foxe's Chaucer both derived from and contributed to the printed editions of Chaucer's Works, particularly the pseudepigrapha. Jack Upland was first printed in Foxe's Acts and Monuments, and then it appeared in Speght's edition of Chaucer's Works.

Speght's "Life of Chaucer" echoes Foxe's own account, which is itself dependent upon the earlier editions that added the Testament of Love and The Plowman's Tale to their pages. Like Speght's Chaucer, Foxe's Chaucer was also a shrewd (or lucky) political survivor. In his 1563 edition, Foxe "thought it not out of season … to couple … some mention of Geoffrey Chaucer" with a discussion of John Colet, a possible source for John Skelton's character Colin Clout.

Probably referring to the 1542 Act for the Advancement of True Religion, Foxe said that he "marvel[s] to consider … how the bishops, condemning and abolishing all manner of English books and treatises which might bring the people to any light of knowledge, did yet authorise the works of Chaucer to remain still and to be occupied; who, no doubt, saw into religion as much almost as even we do now, and uttereth in his works no less, and seemeth to be a right Wicklevian, or else there never was any. And that, all his works almost, if they be thoroughly advised, will testify (albeit done in mirth, and covertly); and especially the latter end of his third book of the Testament of Love … Wherein, except a man be altogether blind, he may espy him at the full: although in the same book (as in all others he useth to do), under shadows covertly, as under a visor, he suborneth truth in such sort, as both privily she may profit the godly-minded, and yet not be espied of the crafty adversary. And therefore the bishops, belike, taking his works but for jests and toys, in condemning other books, yet permitted his books to be read."

It is significant, too, that Foxe's discussion of Chaucer leads into his history of "The Reformation of the Church of Christ in the Time of Martin Luther" when "Printing, being opened, incontinently ministered unto the church the instruments and tools of learning and knowledge; which were good books and authors, which before lay hid and unknown. The science of printing being found, immediately followed the grace of God; which stirred up good wits aptly to conceive the light of knowledge and judgment: by which light darkness began to be espied, and ignorance to be detected; truth from error, religion from superstition, to be discerned."

Foxe downplays Chaucer's bawdy and amorous writing, insisting that it all testifies to his piety. Material that is troubling is deemed metaphoric, while the more forthright satire (which Foxe prefers) is taken literally.

John Urry produced the first edition of the complete works of Chaucer in a Latin font, published posthumously in 1721. Included were several tales, according to the editors, for the first time printed, a biography of Chaucer, a glossary of old English words, and testimonials of author writers concerning Chaucer dating back to the 16th century. According to A. S. G Edwards, "This was the first collected edition of Chaucer to be printed in roman type. The life of Chaucer prefixed to the volume was the work of the Reverend John Dart, corrected and revised by Timothy Thomas. The glossary appended was also mainly compiled by Thomas. The text of Urry's edition has often been criticised by subsequent editors for its frequent conjectural emendations, mainly to make it conform to his sense of Chaucer's metre. The justice of such criticisms should not obscure his achievement. His is the first edition of Chaucer for nearly a hundred and fifty years to consult any manuscripts and is the first since that of William Thynne in 1534 to seek systematically to assemble a substantial number of manuscripts to establish his text. It is also the first edition to offer descriptions of the manuscripts of Chaucer's works, and the first to print texts of 'Gamelyn' and 'The Tale of Beryn', works ascribed to, but not by, Chaucer."

Modern scholarship

Although Chaucer's works had long been admired, serious scholarly work on his legacy did not begin until the late 18th century, when Thomas Tyrwhitt edited The Canterbury Tales, and it did not become an established academic discipline until the 19th century.

Scholars such as Frederick James Furnivall, who founded the Chaucer Society in 1868, pioneered the establishment of diplomatic editions of Chaucer's major texts, along with careful accounts of Chaucer's language and prosody. Walter William Skeat, who like Furnivall was closely associated with the Oxford English Dictionary, established the base text of all of Chaucer's works with his edition, published by Oxford University Press. Later editions by John H. Fisher and Larry D. Benson offered further refinements, along with critical commentary and bibliographies.

With the textual issues largely addressed, if not resolved, attention turned to the questions of Chaucer's themes, structure, and audience. The Chaucer Research Project at the University of Chicago began in 1924. The Chaucer Review was founded in 1966 and has maintained its position as the pre-eminent journal of Chaucer studies. In 1994, literary critic Harold Bloom placed Chaucer among the greatest Western writers of all time, and in 1997 expounded on William Shakespeare's debt to the author.

List of works
The following major works are in rough chronological order but scholars still debate the dating of most of Chaucer's output and works made up from a collection of stories may have been compiled over a long period.

Major works
Translation of Roman de la Rose, possibly extant as The Romaunt of the Rose
The Book of the Duchess
The House of Fame
Anelida and Arcite
Parlement of Foules
Translation of Boethius' Consolation of Philosophy as Boece
Troilus and Criseyde
The Legend of Good Women
The Canterbury Tales
A Treatise on the Astrolabe

Short poems
An ABC
Chaucers Wordes unto Adam, His Owne Scriveyn (disputed)
The Complaint unto Pity
The Complaint of Chaucer to his Purse
The Complaint of Mars
The Complaint of Venus
A Complaint to His Lady
The Former Age
Fortune
Gentilesse
Lak of Stedfastnesse
Lenvoy de Chaucer a Scogan
Lenvoy de Chaucer a Bukton
Proverbs

Balade to Rosemounde
Truth
Womanly Noblesse

Poems of doubtful authorship
Against Women Unconstant
A Balade of Complaint
Complaynt D'Amours
Merciles Beaute
The Equatorie of the Planets – A rough translation of a Latin work derived from an Arab work of the same title. It is a description of the construction and use of a planetary equatorium, which was used in calculating planetary orbits and positions (at the time it was believed the sun orbited the Earth). The similar Treatise on the Astrolabe, not usually doubted as Chaucer's work, in addition to Chaucer's name as a gloss to the manuscript are the main pieces of evidence for the ascription to Chaucer. However, the evidence Chaucer wrote such a work is questionable, and as such is not included in The Riverside Chaucer. If Chaucer did not compose this work, it was probably written by a contemporary.

Works presumed lost
Of the Wreched Engendrynge of Mankynde, possible translation of Innocent III's De miseria conditionis humanae
Origenes upon the Maudeleyne
The Book of the Leoun – "The Book of the Lion" is mentioned in Chaucer's retraction. It has been speculated that it may have been a redaction of Guillaume de Machaut's 'Dit dou lyon,' a story about courtly love (a subject about which Chaucer frequently wrote).

Spurious works
The Pilgrim's Tale – written in the 16th century with many Chaucerian allusions
The Plowman's Tale or The Complaint of the Ploughman – a Lollard satire later appropriated as a Protestant text
Pierce the Ploughman's Crede – a Lollard satire later appropriated by Protestants
The Ploughman's Tale – its body is largely a version of Thomas Hoccleve's "Item de Beata Virgine"
"La Belle Dame Sans Merci" – frequently attributed to Chaucer, but actually a translation by Richard Roos of Alain Chartier's poem
The Testament of Love – actually by Thomas Usk
Jack Upland – a Lollard satire
The Floure and the Leafe – a 15th-century allegory

Derived works
God Spede the Plough – Borrows twelve stanzas of Chaucer's Monk's Tale

See also

Chaucer (surname)
Middle English literature
Poet-diplomat

Notes

References

Bibliography

Fruoco, Jonathan (2020). Chaucer's Polyphony. The Modern in Medieval Poetry. Berlin-Kalamazoo: Medieval Institute Publications, De Gruyter. .
Fruoco, Jonathan, ed. and transl. (2021). Le Livre de la Duchesse: oeuvres complètes (Tome I). Paris: Classiques Garnier, ISBN 978-2406119999.

Life-records of Chaucer. London: Published for the Chaucer Society by K. Paul, Trench, Trubner & Co., 1875-1900.

External links

Chaucer Bibliography Online

Educational institutions
Chaucer Page by Harvard University, including interlinear translation of The Canterbury Tales
Caxton's Chaucer – Complete digitised texts of Caxton's two earliest editions of The Canterbury Tales from the British Library
Caxton's Canterbury Tales: The British Library Copies An online edition with complete transcriptions and images captured by the HUMI Project
Chaucer Metapage – Project in addition to the 33rd International Congress of Medieval Studies
Chaucer and his works: Introduction to Chaucer and his works (Descriptions of books with images, University of Glasgow Library)

 
1343 births
1400 deaths
14th-century English writers
Burials at Westminster Abbey
The Canterbury Tales
English Catholic poets
English civil servants
English translators
English MPs 1386
Middle English poets
People from the City of London
Writers from London
14th-century English poets
Medieval orientalists
14th-century translators
Medieval English writers